Torchiara is a town and comune in the province of Salerno in the Campania region of south-western Italy.

Geography
The municipality borders with Agropoli, Laureana Cilento, Lustra, Prignano Cilento and Rutino. It counts the frazione of Copersito.

See also
Cilento

References

External links

Cities and towns in Campania
Localities of Cilento